MOSH mobile was an MVNO that was an invite only service created in Indiana, United States. The service ran on a GSM network with service provided by Centennial Wireless. MOSH mobile offered customers free mobile service on the basis that they agreed to receive mobile phone content advertising and interact with the company through advertising campaigns. MOSH mobile never provided international calling. The carrier was targeted at the youth category (18–24 years old) in a bid to replace the former Amp'd Mobile as the younger set's mobile provider of choice. 

As of November 20, 2012, The MOSH Mobile website redirects to the official AT&T website.

Mobile virtual network operators
Defunct mobile phone companies of the United States
Companies based in Fort Wayne, Indiana
Defunct companies based in Indiana